San Blas is an electoral parish Parish (administrative division) (parroquia electorale urban) or district of Quito. The parish was established as a result of the October 2004 political elections when the city was divided into 19 urban electoral parishes.

References

External links 
 San Blas Church

Parishes of Quito Canton